Cooee Bay is a coastal locality in the Livingstone Shire, Queensland, Australia. In the  Cooee Bay had a population of 913 people.

Geography
Cooee Bay is bounded to the east by the Coral Sea.

Like its neighbouring suburb Taranganba, Cooee Bay is separated from Yeppoon by Ross Creek, a popular fishing location.

Cooee Bay has the following headlands (from north to south):

 Wave Point
 Keppel Outlook
 Wreck Point
These headlands create a number of small bays (from north to south):

 Yeppoon Inlet at the mouth of Ross Creek
 Fishermans Bay south of the mount of Ross Creek
 Brumms Cove between Wave Point and Keppel Outlook
 Cooee Bay south of Keppel Outlook

Matthew Flinders Drive is an alternative tourist deviation from the Scenic Highway, which travels up to Wreck Point.  From the lookout, the visitor can enjoy views to  Byfield, Great Keppel Island, and Rosslyn.

Cooee Bay is an established but eclectic community which is reflected in the myriad styles of homes.  Much of the back blocks contain weatherboard or fibro homes well over a century old, while facing the bay are palatial award-winning homes.

History
Cooee Bay Post Office opened on 18 September 1961 by Don and Edna Schabe who had previously owned the Cooee Bay General Store. There is a memorial to Don Schabe in the park for his contribution to the Cooee Bay Progress Association. Prior to the opening of the post office, a receiving office had been open from 1894. The post office closed in 1977.

During World War 2 Cooee Bay was heavily occupied by the US Army.

Prior to local government amalgamations in 2008, the Capricorn Coast was administered by Livingstone Shire Council. From 2008 to 2013 it was administered by Rockhampton Region. From 1 January 2014, the Shire of Livingstone was restored and now administers Cooee Bay.

In the  Cooee Bay had a population of 913 people.

Community
Cooee Bay is a vibrant community with extensive residential developments and investments injecting the area with new growth.

The residents of Cooee Bay are a mix of fishermen, miners, retirees, and business professionals, many of whom prefer to commute to Rockhampton City for work but live on the coast.

See also

 Capricorn Coast
 Yeppoon

References

Beaches of Queensland
Shire of Livingstone
Capricorn Coast
Localities in Queensland